Michael Rowan Harvey Barbour (10 July 1922 in Gisborne – 19 May 2004 in Taradale) was a New Zealand cricketer who played three first-class matches for Northern Districts in the Plunket Shield.

References
http://www.espncricinfo.com/newzealand/content/player/36376.html

1922 births
2004 deaths
New Zealand cricketers
Cricketers from Gisborne, New Zealand
Northern Districts cricketers